Edison is a township located in Middlesex County, in the U.S. state of New Jersey. Situated in Central New Jersey within the core of the state's Raritan Valley region, Edison is a commercial hub (home to Menlo Park Mall and Little India) and is a bedroom community of New York City within the New York metropolitan area. As of the 2020 United States census, the township was the state's sixth-most-populous municipality, with a population of 107,588, an increase of 7,621 (+7.6%) from the 2010 census count of 99,967, which in turn reflected an increase of 2,280 (+2.3%) from the 97,687 counted in the 2000 census.

What is now Edison Township was originally incorporated as Raritan Township by an act of the New Jersey Legislature on March 17, 1870, from portions of both Piscataway Township and Woodbridge Township. The township got its original name from the Raritan indigenous people. Portions of the township were taken to form Metuchen on March 20, 1900, and Highland Park on March 15, 1905. The name was officially changed to Edison Township on November 10, 1954, in honor of inventor Thomas Edison, who had his main laboratory in the Menlo Park section of the township.

History

Early history
The earliest residents of the area were the Raritan people of the Lenape Native Americans, who lived in the area and travelled through it to the shore. In 1646, Chief Matouchin led a group of 1,200 warriors.

Edison Township, comprising former sections of Piscataway and Woodbridge townships, was settled (by Europeans) in the 17th century. The earliest village was Piscatawaytown, which is centered around St. James Church and the Piscatawaytown Common, near the intersection of Plainfield and Woodbridge Avenues in South Edison. The Laing House of Plainfield Plantation (listed on the National Register in 1988), the Benjamin Shotwell House (listed 1987) and the Homestead Farm at Oak Ridge (liste 1995), are buildings from the colonial era included in National Register of Historic Places listings in Middlesex County.

The community was previously known as "Raritan Township", not to be confused with the current-day Raritan Township in Hunterdon County.

The Edison era

In 1876, Thomas Edison set up his home and research laboratory in New Jersey on the site of an unsuccessful real estate development in Raritan Township called "Menlo Park", (currently located in Edison State Park). While there he earned the nickname "the Wizard of Menlo Park". Before his death at age 83 in 1931, the prolific inventor amassed a record 1,093 patents for creations including the phonograph, a stock ticker, the motion-picture camera, the incandescent light bulb, a mechanical vote counter, the alkaline storage battery including one for an electric car, and the first commercial electric light.

The Menlo Park lab was significant in that was one of the first laboratories to pursue practical, commercial applications of research. It was in his Menlo Park laboratory that Thomas Edison came up with the phonograph and a commercially viable incandescent light bulb filament. Christie Street was the first street in the world to use electric lights for illumination. Edison subsequently left Menlo Park and moved his home and laboratory to West Orange in 1886.

20th century
Near Piscatawaytown village, a portion of the township was informally known as "Nixon", after Lewis Nixon, a manufacturer and community leader. Soon after the outbreak of World War I, Nixon established a massive volatile chemicals processing facility there, known as the Nixon Nitration Works. It was the site of the 1924 Nixon Nitration Works disaster, a massive explosion and resulting fire that killed 20 people and destroyed several square miles of the township.

In 1954, the township's name was changed to honor inventor Thomas A. Edison. Also on the ballot in 1954 was a failed proposal to change the community's name to Nixon.

In 1959, the Menlo Park Mall, a two-level super regional shopping mall, opened on U.S. Route 1.

21st century
Edison has been one of the fastest-growing municipalities in New Jersey. As of the 2000 United States Census, it was the fifth most-populated municipality in the state, after the cities of Newark, Jersey City, Paterson, and Elizabeth.

Edison is primarily a middle-class community with more than 75 ethnic communities represented. Edison has a large Jewish community next to Highland Park, with multiple synagogues located in Edison. Edison also has a growing Indian community and a number of temples serving the religious needs of the community. Reflecting the number of Edison's residents from India and China, the township has sister city arrangements with Shijiazhuang, China, and Baroda, India.

Edison was ranked the 28th most-livable small city in the United States by CNN Money magazine, and second in New Jersey in 2006 in Money magazine's "Best Places To Live". In 2008, two years later, Money ranked the township 35th out of the top 100 places to live in the United States. In the 2006 survey of America's Safest Cities, the township was ranked 23rd, out of 371 cities included nationwide, in the 13th annual Morgan Quitno survey. In 2009, Edison was ranked as one of "America's 10 Best Places to Grow Up" by U.S. News & World Report. The rankings focused on low crime, strong schools, green spaces, and abundance of recreational activities. In 2014, parenting.com ranked Edison as the top safest city in America.

Geography

According to the United States Census Bureau, the township had a total area of 30.69 square miles (79.49 km2), including 30.06 square miles (77.86 km2) of land and 0.63 square miles (1.63 km2) of water (2.05%).

Edison is on the east side of Raritan Valley (a line of communities in central New Jersey), along with Plainfield, and completely surrounds the borough of Metuchen, New Jersey, making it part of 21 pairs of "doughnut towns" in the state, where one municipality entirely surrounds another. The township borders the municipalities of East Brunswick, Highland Park, New Brunswick, Piscataway, Sayreville, South Plainfield and Woodbridge Township in Middlesex County; Clark, Plainfield and Scotch Plains in Union County.

Edison has numerous sections and neighborhoods. Unincorporated communities, localities and place names located partially or completely within the township include Bonhamtown, Camp Kilmer, Centerville, Clara Barton, Eggert Mills, Greensand, Haven Homes, Lahiere, Lincoln Park, Lindenau, Martins Landing, Menlo Park, Millville, New Dover, New Durham, Nixon, North Edison, Oak Tree, Phoenix, Potters, Pumptown, Raritan Arsenal, Raritan Manor, Sand Hills, Silver Lake, Stelton, Valentine, and Washington Park.

Edison is about halfway between Midtown Manhattan, and New Jersey's capitol, Trenton, being about 27 miles from both.

While the Township's topography is mostly flat, there are some hillier areas. The highest point is on Grandview Avenue, which reaches a maximum elevation of about 220 feet. The lowest elevation in the township is on sea level on the Raritan River.

The Robinsons Branch of the Rahway River flows through Edison en route to the Robinson's Branch Reservoir.

Climate
According to the Köppen Climate Classification system, Edison has a Humid Subtropical climate (Cfa) with abundant rainfall throughout the year although the late summer months tend to have more rain. Summers tend to be hot and humid with a lot of rain and Winters tend to be cool to cold with snow being an annual occurrence with snow falling multiple times every winter. Winter and Fall tend to have more clear days than in the Spring and Summer.

Demographics

Asian community
Edison hosts one of the region's main centers of Asian American cultural diversity. The growing Little India is a South Asian-focused commercial strip in Middlesex County, the U.S. county with the highest concentration of Asian Indians. The Oak Tree Road strip runs for about one-and-a-half miles through Edison and neighboring Iselin in Woodbridge Township, near the area's sprawling Chinatown and Koreatown, running along New Jersey Route 27. It is the largest and most diverse South Asian cultural hub in the United States. In Middlesex County, election ballots are printed in English, Spanish, Gujarati, Hindi, and Punjabi. As part of the 2010 Census, 28.3% of Edison residents identified themselves as being Indian American. In the 2000 Census, 17.75% of Edison residents identified themselves as being Indian American, the highest percentage of Indian-American people of any municipality in the United States with 1,000 or more residents identifying their ancestry.

Historical population

2010 census

The Census Bureau's 2006–2010 American Community Survey showed that (in 2010 inflation-adjusted dollars) median household income was $86,725 (with a margin of error of +/− $3,000) and the median family income was $100,008 (+/− $2,624). Males had a median income of $66,898 (+/− $4,094) versus $50,953 (+/− $1,462) for females. The per capita income for the township was $36,464 (+/− $1,184). About 3.5% of families and 7.2% of the population were below the poverty line, including 8.6% of those under age 18 and 6.3% of those age 65 or over.

2000 census
As of the 2000 United States census there were 97,687 people, 35,136 households, and 25,881 families residing in the township. The population density was 3,243.0 people per square mile (1,252.2/km2). There were 36,018 housing units at an average density of 1,195.7 per square mile (461.7/km2). The racial makeup of the township was 59.49% White, 29.27% Asian, 6.89% African American, 0.14% Native American, .04% Pacific Islander, 2.02% from other races, and 2.15% from two or more races. 6.37% of the population are Hispanic or Latino of any race.

There were 35,136 households, out of which 34.3% had children under the age of 18 living in them, 61.1% were married couples living together, 9.1% had a female householder with no husband present, and 26.3% were non-families. 21.1% of all households were made up of individuals, and 7.2% had someone living alone who was 65 years of age or older. The average household size was 2.72 and the average family size was 3.19.

In the township the population was spread out, with 22.9% under the age of 18, 7.8% from 18 to 24, 34.0% from 25 to 44, 23.4% from 45 to 64, and 11.9% who were 65 years of age or older. The median age was 36 years. For every 100 females, there were 96.3 males. For every 100 females age 18 and over, there were 94.0 males.

The median household income in the township is $69,746, and the median income for a family was $77,976. Males had a median income of $53,303 versus $36,829 for females. The per capita income for the township was $30,148. About 3.3% of families and 4.8% of the population were below the poverty line, including 4.3% of those under age 18 and 6.3% of those age 65 or over.

Economy

Manufacturing

A number of production facilities in and around the area, included Edison Assembly, Ford Motor Company's production plant for Rangers, Mustangs, Pintos, Mercurys, and Lincolns. Other notable companies included Frigidaire's air-conditioner plant in Edison, Siemens in Edison.

Starting in the 2000s, manufacturing began to leave Central Jersey, and many facilities closed and moved overseas. The Ford plant was demolished by 2008 and was replaced by Sam's Club, Topgolf and Starbucks.

Corporate presence
Majesco Entertainment, a video game company, has its corporate headquarters in Edison. Other companies have warehouse operations within Edison. These companies include the Italian food producer and importer Colavita, an Amazon fulfillment center, as well as the regional hubs for FedEx, UPS, and Newegg. In addition Edison is home to the state's largest private convention center, the New Jersey Convention and Exposition Center, located within the Raritan Center Business Park. Raritan Center itself is the largest industrial park on the east side of the Mississippi River. The United States headquarters of the international company Zylog Systems is located in Edison, as is the headquarters of the e-commerce companies Boxed and Bare Necessities.

Sports
Plainfield Country Club is a private country club that has hosted the 1987 U.S. Women's Open and The Barclays golf tournament, the first PGA Tour FedEx Cup playoff event, in both 2011 and 2015.

Parks
Oak Tree Pond is the site of the Battle of Short Hills, a minor battle of the American Revolutionary War and whose conversion into a park ended a real estate development controversy.

The park was established in 1917, making it the oldest county park in Middlesex County.

Edison State Park and Dismal Swamp are also located in the township.

Government

Local government
Edison Township operates within the Faulkner Act, formally known as the Optional Municipal Charter Law, under the Mayor-Council form of government, which was implemented as of January 1, 1958, based on the recommendations of a Charter Study Commission. The township is one of 71 municipalities (of the 564) statewide governed under this form. Edison's governing body is comprised of the Mayor and the seven-member Township Council. Members of the council are elected at-large in partisan elections held as part of the November general election to four-year terms of office on a staggered basis, with three or four seats coming up for election in odd-numbered years, with the mayoral seat up for vote at the same time that three seats are expiring.

, the Mayor of Edison is Democrat Samip "Sam" Joshi, whose term of office ends December 31, 2025. Members of the Township Council are Council President Joseph Coyle (D, 2023), Council Vice President Joyce Ship-Freeman (D, 2023), Richard Brescher (D, 2023), Margot Harris (D, 2025), Nishith Patel (D, 2025), Ajay Patil (D, 2023) and John Poyner (D, 2025).

The first (and to-date, only) female Mayor of Edison was Antonia "Toni" Ricigliano, whose term of office ended on December 31, 2013.

Election 2017 
Former Edison Democratic Chair and Detective Keith Hahn ran for mayor as a Republican against incumbent Mayor Thomas Lankey. Lankey was re-elected with 12,032 votes to Hahn's 8,574 votes.

Election 2016
In June 2016, the Township Council selected Joseph Coyle from a list of three candidates nominated by the Democratic municipal committee to fill the seat expiring in December 2019 that had been held by Robert Karabinchak, until he stepped down from office to take a vacant seat in the New Jersey General Assembly. Coyle served on an interim basis until the November 2016 general election, when voters elected him to fill the balance of the term of office.

Election 2005
Running on a good government platform and a call to reform the Democratic Party, Jun Choi won the June 2005 primary by a 56–44% margin, defeating longtime incumbent Mayor George A. Spadoro, the first time in Edison history that a challenger won the Democratic primary. Choi won endorsements from mainstream Democratic leaders including Bill Bradley, for whom he worked on the 2000 presidential campaign, and was unexpectedly endorsed by a number of traditionally candidate-neutral unions in Edison.

In the ensuing general election, Choi did not face a Republican candidate, but instead faced a former Democrat turned Independent, William (Bill) Stephens. An article in The American Prospect details aspects that Choi brought together in his 2005 mayoral campaign, including 1. attracting new voters into the process, 2. a good government message, 3. anti-Wal-Mart or economic justice theme and 4. an effective Internet-based progressive mobilization.

On Election Day, November 8, 2005, Jun Choi declared victory, leading in unofficial results with a vote of 12,126 to 11,935. However, due to the small margin of victory, candidate William Stephens pursued a recount and subsequently, an election contest, both without success. On January 1, 2006, at age 34, Mayor Choi was sworn-in by Governor Jon Corzine as the youngest Mayor in Edison history. Choi ran for re-election in 2009, but was defeated in the primary election by Antonia "Toni" Ricigliano, who went on to win the general election, and took office January 1, 2010.

Recent politics in Edison have concerned plans for zoning the township to facilitate the creation of "walkable" communities that will attract businesses, while still maintaining open spaces and parks and easy access to commuter transit. This strategy is meant to encourage "Smart Growth".

Politics in Edison since the 2005 mayoral election have been polarized by an attempt by retail giant Walmart to open a store in central Edison near the junction of Interstate 287 and New Jersey Route 27. Even though Jun Choi stated in his mayoral campaign that he would stop Walmart from being built, Walmart filed suit and won, and Choi was there to cut the yellow ribbon when the store was opened.

Law enforcement
The town is served by the full-time Edison Division of Police, led by Chief Thomas Bryan and employing 168 officers as of 2012, assisted by the Edison Auxiliary Police. The department is striving to overcome a history of widespread officer misconduct.

Federal, state, and county representation
Edison is located in the 6th Congressional District and is part of New Jersey's 18th state legislative district.

 

Middlesex County is governed by a Board of County Commissioners, whose seven members are elected at-large on a partisan basis to serve three-year terms of office on a staggered basis, with either two or three seats coming up for election each year as part of the November general election. At an annual reorganization meeting held in January, the board selects from among its members a commissioner director and deputy director. , Middlesex County's Commissioners (with party affiliation, term-end year, and residence listed in parentheses) are 
Commissioner Director Ronald G. Rios (D, Carteret, term as commissioner ends December 31, 2024; term as commissioner director ends 2022),
Commissioner Deputy Director Shanti Narra (D, North Brunswick, term as commissioner ends 2024; term as deputy director ends 2022),
Claribel A. "Clary" Azcona-Barber (D, New Brunswick, 2022),
Charles Kenny (D, Woodbridge Township, 2022),
Leslie Koppel (D, Monroe Township, 2023),
Chanelle Scott McCullum (D, Piscataway, 2024) and 
Charles E. Tomaro (D, Edison, 2023).
Constitutional officers are
County Clerk Nancy Pinkin (D, 2025, East Brunswick),
Sheriff Mildred S. Scott (D, 2022, Piscataway) and 
Surrogate Claribel Cortes (D, 2026; North Brunswick).

Politics
As of March 2011, there were a total of 53,352 registered voters in Edison Township, of which 25,163 (47.2%) were registered as Democrats, 6,242 (11.7%) were registered as Republicans and 21,929 (41.1%) were registered as Unaffiliated. There were 18 voters registered to other parties.

In the 2012 presidential election, Democrat Barack Obama received 62.8% of the vote (22,104 cast), ahead of Republican Mitt Romney with 36.3% (12,769 votes), and other candidates with 1.0% (339 votes), among the 35,546 ballots cast by the township's 54,857 registered voters (334 ballots were spoiled), for a turnout of 64.8%. In the 2008 presidential election, Democrat Barack Obama received 58.8% of the vote (22,409 cast), ahead of Republican John McCain with 39.3% (14,986 votes) and other candidates with 1.1% (418 votes), among the 38,129 ballots cast by the township's 55,305 registered voters, for a turnout of 68.9%. In the 2004 presidential election, Democrat John Kerry received 55.2% of the vote (20,000 ballots cast), outpolling Republican George W. Bush with 43.1% (15,615 votes) and other candidates with 0.6% (311 votes), among the 36,205 ballots cast by the township's 52,308 registered voters, for a turnout percentage of 69.2.

In the 2013 gubernatorial election, Republican Chris Christie received 58.6% of the vote (12,502 cast), ahead of Democrat Barbara Buono with 39.3% (8,373 votes), and other candidates with 2.1% (443 votes), among the 21,877 ballots cast by the township's 55,392 registered voters (559 ballots were spoiled), for a turnout of 39.5%. In the 2009 gubernatorial election, Republican Chris Christie received 46.6% of the vote (11,230 ballots cast), ahead of Democrat Jon Corzine with 44.5% (10,727 votes), Independent Chris Daggett with 6.4% (1,549 votes) and other candidates with 1.0% (243 votes), among the 24,097 ballots cast by the township's 53,358 registered voters, yielding a 45.2% turnout.

Education

Public schools
The Edison Township Public Schools serve students in pre-kindergarten through twelfth grade. The district's two high schools separate the south and north ends of Edison. In the Edison High School zone to the south, there are six K–5 elementary schools, while in the J.P. Stevens High School zone there are five K–5 elementary schools. As of the 2017–2018 school year, the district, comprised of 19 schools, had an enrollment of 16,203 students and 1,029.8 classroom teachers (on an FTE basis), for a student–teacher ratio of 15.7:1. Schools in the district (with 2017–2018 enrollment data from the National Center for Education Statistics) are 
Edison Early Learning Center (80 students; grades Pre-K–K), 
Franklin D. Roosevelt Preschool (140; Pre-K–K), 
Benjamin Franklin Elementary School (610; K–5), 
Martin Luther King Jr. Elementary School (697; K–5), 
Lincoln Elementary School (835; K–5), 
Lindeneau Elementary School (478; K–5), 
James Madison Primary School (584; K–2, who then move on to James Madison Intermediate), 
James Madison Intermediate School (663; 3–5), 
John Marshall Elementary School (846; K–5), 
Menlo Park Elementary School (857; K–5), 
James Monroe Elementary School (542; K–5), 
Washington Elementary School (602; K–5), 
Woodbrook Elementary School (964; K–5), 
John Adams Middle School (952; 6–8, from James Madison Intermediate and MLK Jr.),  
Herbert Hoover Middle School (826; 6–8, from Franklin, Lincoln and Monroe), 
Thomas Jefferson Middle School (744; 6–8, from Lindeneau, Marshall and Washington), 
Woodrow Wilson Middle School (1,196; from Menlo Park and Woodbrook), 
Edison High School (1,971; 9–12, from Hoover and Jefferson) and 
J.P. Stevens High School (2,486; 9–12, from Adams and Wilson).

J.P. Stevens was the 80th-ranked public high school in New Jersey out of 328 schools statewide in New Jersey Monthly magazine's September 2012 cover story on the state's "Top Public High Schools", after being ranked 65th in 2010 out of 322 schools listed, while Edison High School was ranked 174 in 2012 and 169 in 2010. According to U.S. News & World Report in 2016, J.P. Stevens ranked 41st within New Jersey and 905th nationally, while Edison H.S. ranked 59th and 2,015th.

The community is also served by the Greater Brunswick Charter School, a K–8 charter school serving students from Edison, Highland Park, Milltown and New Brunswick. As of the 2017–2018 school year, the school had an enrollment of 395 students and 33.0 classroom teachers (on an FTE basis), for a student–teacher ratio of 12.0:1.

Eighth grade students from all of Middlesex County are eligible to apply to attend the high school programs offered by the Middlesex County Vocational and Technical Schools, a county-wide vocational school district that offers full-time career and technical education at Middlesex County Academy in Edison, the Academy for Allied Health and Biomedical Sciences in Woodbridge Township and at its East Brunswick, Perth Amboy and Piscataway technical high schools, with no tuition charged to students for attendance. Middlesex County College is home to the Middlesex County Academy for Science, Mathematics, and Engineering Technologies, an engineering-based high school, which is part of the Middlesex County Vocational and Technical Schools. The high school is covered by tax dollars and so there is no additional cost for all Middlesex County residents, but admission is based on a test, past grades, and other academic and extracurricular activities. About 160 students, 40 per grade from around the county attend the Academy.

Private schools
Bishop George Ahr High School (9–12), St. Helena School (Pre-K–8) and St. Matthew School (Pre-K–8) operate under the supervision of Roman Catholic Diocese of Metuchen. Jewish schools in the township, which all operate independently, include Rabbi Jacob Joseph School, Rabbi Pesach Raymon Yeshiva (Pre-K–8, founded in 1945) and Yeshiva Shaarei Tzion (Pre-K–8, opened in 1992).

Other private schools in Edison include Lakeview School (for children ages 3–21 with disabilities), Our Lady of Peace School and Wardlaw-Hartridge School (Pre-K–12, founded in 1882).

In 1998, the Huaxia Edison Chinese School, which teaches in Simplified Chinese on Sunday afternoons, was established in Thomas Jefferson Middle School, subsequently relocating to Herbert Hoover Middle School. Huaxia currently resides in Edison High School. However, many families from Taiwan send their children to Edison Chinese School, located at John Adams Middle School, or Tzu Chi, located at Woodrow Wilson Middle School. These schools both teach Traditional Chinese. J.P. Stevens High School offers Mandarin Chinese and Hindi as an elective language for students who are interested in learning it.

Colleges
Lincoln Technical Institute (or Lincoln Tech) is a for-profit vocational school located in Edison. Lincoln Tech offers various programs in Nursing and in medical and computer applications.

Middlesex County College (MCC) is a public, two-year community college located in Edison at the intersection of Woodbridge Avenue and Mill Road.

Rutgers University's Livingston campus is located on the former Camp Kilmer, partially located in Edison.

Libraries
Edison has three public library branches.

Infrastructure

Transportation

Roads and highways

Edison is a transportation hub, with an extensive network of highways passing through the township and connecting to major Northeast cities, New York City, Boston, Philadelphia, Trenton, New Jersey, Washington, D.C. and others.

State roads include Route 27 and 440, both of which are state-maintained. U.S. Route 1 also passes through the township. Interstate 287 passes through Edison, where it houses its southern end at I-95. The municipality also houses about a  section of the New Jersey Turnpike (Interstate 95). Exit 10 is located in Edison, featuring a 13-lane toll gate and a unique interchange design. When the "dual-dual" setup of the turnpike was created, it first started in Edison and continued north to Exit 14 in Newark. It wasn't until 1973 that the "dual-dual" was extended south of 10 to Exit 9 in East Brunswick Township (and then extended further south in 1990 to Exit 8A in Monroe Township).

Since Interstate 287 connects to Interstate 87 (the New York State Thruway), Exit 10 (of the turnpike) is one of the busiest interchanges to be used by tractor-trailers as it connects the New Jersey Turnpike to the New York Thruway. For truck drivers, it is the only direct limited-access road connection they have from the Turnpike to the Thruway as the Garden State Parkway, which has its northern terminus at the Thruway, prohibits trucks from using the roadway north of Exit 105.

In 2009, the New Jersey Department of Transportation selected Edison as one of the first communities to have a red light camera enforcement system. The program was ended by the state in December 2014, despite a more than 30% drop in accidents at the three camera-controlled intersections in the township.

Public transportation
Edison station, located in South Edison, is served by NJ Transit northbound trains to Newark Penn Station and Penn Station New York, and southbound to the Trenton Transit Center via the Northeast Corridor Line, with connecting service to Amtrak, and SEPTA. Some passengers in North Edison are closer to, and may prefer to use, the Metropark station (near neighboring Iselin in Woodbridge Township) or Metuchen station.

NJ Transit bus service is provided on the 62 route to Newark, with local service available on the 801, 804, 805, 810, 813, 814, 819, 978 and 979 routes.

The Taiwanese airline China Airlines provides private bus service to John F. Kennedy International Airport from the Kam Man Food location in Edison to feed its flight to Taipei, Taiwan.

Healthcare

JFK Medical Center, located on James Street off Parsonage Road is a 498-bed hospital founded in 1967.

Roosevelt Care Center is a long term/sub-acute care facility located just east of Roosevelt Park. The facility was original constructed in 1936 under the auspices of the Work Projects Administration.

Edison is served by the Raritan Valley Regional EMS. The squad consists of three sub-squads, Edison First Aid Squad #1 (established in 1935), Edison First Aid Squad #2 (since 1936) and Clara Barton First Aid Squad (since 1951). The three squads merged in 2009 to better provide residents of Edison with more comprehensive care. RVREMS receives support from paramedics out of JFK Medical Center. The squad consists of approximately 50 volunteer EMTs.

Telecommunications

Edison is served by area codes 732 and 848 and 908. Area Code 848 is an overlay area code that was created so that a split was not needed.

Edison has five Verizon Central offices serving the Township:

 Central Office Rahway (Switch ID: RHWYNJRADS5) (Area Code 732): Serving from Wood Avenue North to Roxy Avenue on the west side of the Street inward to New Dover Road.
 Central Office Plainfield (Switch ID: PLFDNJPFDS5) (Area Code 908): Serving Roxy Avenue heading north into South Plainfield on both sides of Inman Avenue.
 Central Office Metuchen (Switch ID: MTCHNJMTDS5) (Area Code 732): Serving Edison, Metuchen and Iselin (Technically Iselin Numbers that have 732–283 and 732–404 are routed out of the Woodbridge Office Switch ID: WDBRNJWDDS5).
 Central Office Edison (Switch ID: EDSNNJEDDS5): Serving South Edison with phone numbers that come up as "New Brunswick" – 732–339, 732–393, 732–572, 732–777, 732–819, 732–985, and Exchanges for "Metuchen" that are 732–248, 732–287, 732–650.
 Central Office Fords (Switch ID: FRDSNJFRDS5): Serving Eastern Edison area and Raritan Center areas with 732–225, 732–346, 732–417, 732–512 and Perth Amboy Exchanges 732–661, 732–738.

In 1982, the BPU and New Jersey Bell, after receiving thousands of complaints from both North and South Edison residents, made an exception that any calls originating and terminating in the Township would be considered a local call. This was due to the new home construction in Edison where existing cables that belonged to the Rahway central office were assigned to give new phone service to over 400 homes.

In 1997, mandatory ten-digit dialing came to Edison with the introduction of Area code 732. Edison residents living on Roxy Avenue once again were in the spotlight in the news, with one side of the street served by the Rahway central office (Area code 732) and the other side of the street is served by the Plainfield central office (Area Code 908). Residents complained to the BPU and Bell Atlantic that it would be easier to yell across the street than dial a ten-digit number to call their neighbor across the street.

Edison has Cablevision's Optimum cable television service. Before Cablevision, there was TKR, which was so poorly run that many FCC and BPU complaints about programming and many town hall meetings eventually forced change. TKR was bought out by Cablevision.

Sister cities
  Shijiazhuang, Hebei, China
  Vadodara, Gujarat, India

Notable people

People who were born in, residents of, or otherwise closely associated with Edison include:
 Peter J. Barnes Jr. (1928–2018), Chairman of the New Jersey State Parole Board who had served in the New Jersey General Assembly
 Peter J. Barnes III (born 1956), politicians who serves in the New Jersey General Assembly and previously on the Edison Township Council
 Tyus Battle (born 1997), college basketball player for the Syracuse Orange
 Brandon Bielak (born 1996), pitcher for the Houston Astros of Major League Baseball
 Gayleatha B. Brown (1947–2013), United States Ambassador to Benin and to Burkina Faso
 David Bryan (born 1962), keyboardist, founding member of Bon Jovi
 Michael Campbell (born 1989), wide receiver who played in the NFL for the New York Jets
 Leonte Carroo (born 1994), wide receiver who has played in the NFL for the Miami Dolphins
 Alan Chez (born 1961), trumpet player for the Late Show with David Letterman
 Jun Choi (born 1971), politician who served as Mayor of Edison
 Rich Clementi (born 1976), mixed martial arts fighter
 Ken Cuccinelli (born 1968), former Attorney General of Virginia
 Jerry Dior (1932–2015), graphic designer, best known for creating the Major League Baseball logo
 Tom Dwan (born 1986), professional poker player
 Bernard J. Dwyer (1921–1998), politician who served in the United States House of Representatives from 1981 to 1993
 Thomas Edison (1847–1931), inventor who is the township's namesake
 Katherine Polk Failla (born 1969), United States district judge of the United States District Court for the Southern District of New York
 Darren Fenster (born 1978), former professional baseball player who has been a manager in the Boston Red Sox Minor League Baseball system
 Gail Fisher (1935–2000), actress best known for her role on Mannix
 Rich Gaspari (born 1963), retired professional bodybuilder and founder of supplement company Gaspari Nutrition who was inducted into the IFBB Hall of Fame in 2004
 Frank Guinta (born 1970), served in the U.S. House of Representatives from New Hampshire's 1st congressional district
 Halsey (born 1994 as Ashley Nicolette Frangipane) singer-songwriter
 Pamela Long, singer with former Bad Boy group Total
 Paul Matey (born 1971), attorney who is a United States circuit judge of the United States Court of Appeals for the Third Circuit
 Patrick McDonnell (born 1956), cartoonist, creator Mutts comics
 Earl Schenck Miers (1910–1972), historian who wrote extensively about the American Civil War
 Victor Mitchell (born 1965), former member of the Colorado House of Representatives
 Akash Modi (born 1995), artistic gymnast who represented the United States at the 2018 World Artistic Gymnastics Championships
 Brittany Murphy (1977–2009), actress
 Jim Norton (born 1968), stand-up comedian
 Margie Palatini, author of books for children
 Robert Pastorelli (1954–2004), theater, film and television actor
 Zach Perez (born 1996), professional soccer player who plays as a defender for USL League One club Richmond Kickers
 Marc Pisciotta (born 1970), former Major League Baseball pitcher
 Mark L. Polansky (born 1956), NASA astronaut
 Bernard Purdie (born 1941), prolific session drummer
 Jim Rose (born 1953), sports anchor for WLS-TV in Chicago, Illinois
 Matt Salzberg, businessperson and entrepreneur who co-founded Blue Apron (where he was CEO), Embark Veterinary and Suma Brands
 Susan Sarandon (born 1946), actress, lived in the Stephenville community
 Nancy Shevell (born 1959), third wife of Paul McCartney and a leader in the trucking industry
 Jasmin Singer (born 1979), animal rights activist, writer, speaker and actress
 Chris Snee (born 1982), guard who has played for the New York Giants
 George A. Spadoro (born 1955), former Mayor of Edison, Council President and Assemblyman
 Joel Stein (born 1971), Los Angeles Times columnist
 Robert T. Stevens (1899–1983), businessman and former chairman of J.P. Stevens and Company
 Anthony Stolarz (born 1994), professional ice hockey goaltender for the Anaheim Ducks of the National Hockey League
 Jim Stoops (born 1972), former professional baseball pitcher who played for one season in MLB for the Colorado Rockies
 Jennifer Sung (born 1972), lawyer who is a nominee to be a United States circuit judge of the United States Court of Appeals for the Ninth Circuit
 Marques Townes (born 1995), basketball player for the Loyola Ramblers men's basketball team, who transferred out of Cardinal McCarrick after his sophomore year
 Karl-Anthony Towns (born 1995), professional basketball player for the Minnesota Timberwolves
 Mike Vallely (born 1970), professional skateboarder and lead singer of Black Flag
 Jeffrey A. Warsh (born 1960), politician who served two terms in the New Jersey General Assembly, from 1992 to 1996, where he represented the 18th Legislative District
 Darrin Winston (1966–2008), played two seasons in Major League Baseball for the Philadelphia Phillies
 Jeremy Zuttah (born 1986), offensive lineman for the Tampa Bay Buccaneers

Notable places
 Bonhamtown, site of a battle during the American Revolutionary War
 Camp Kilmer, a World War II era army post, was partially located in what is now Edison.
 Dismal Swamp, preserved wetlands area that also includes portions of Metuchen and South Plainfield.
 Durham Woods, a complex of several apartment buildings and scene of the Edison, New Jersey natural gas explosion in 1994, in which a 36-inch natural gas pipeline burst and exploded, destroying buildings in the area.
 Edison Landfill, landfill site undergoing environmental cleanup since it was ordered closed in 1977.
 Edison station in South Edison, offering service on NJ Transit's Northeast Corridor Line.
 ILR Landfill, closed landfill site owned by Industrial Land Reclaiming (ILR) providing power to Middlesex County's wastewater treatment operations from methane gas recovery.
 Kin-Buc Landfill, former landfill and Superfund site where  of hazardous waste was dumped.
 Laing House of Plainfield Plantation, historic home built in the early 1700s when the region was being settled by Scottish Quakers in the late 17th and early 18th century.
 Roosevelt Park, a 196-acre park next to Menlo Park Mall.
 Oak Tree Road in Edison and the Iselin section of Woodbridge Township is known for its large concentration of Indian stores and restaurants.
 The Thomas Alva Edison Memorial Tower and Museum, in Menlo Park, dedicated in 1938. Located in Edison State Park, at the site where its namesake inventor invented the incandescent light bulb and the phonograph.

See also

 Edison divorce torture plot

References

External links

 

 
1870 establishments in New Jersey
Chinatowns in the United States
Faulkner Act (mayor–council)
Little Indias
Populated places established in 1870
Thomas Edison
Townships in Middlesex County, New Jersey